Edward James Shiels (25 June 1908 – 9 October 1987) was an Australian rules footballer who played with Fitzroy in the Victorian Football League (VFL).		

After three games with Fitzroy in the second half on the 1929 VFL season, in 1930 Shiels accepted a position as coach of Ararat Football Club for the 1930 season.

Notes

External links 
		

1908 births
1987 deaths
Australian rules footballers from Victoria (Australia)
Fitzroy Football Club players